John French (born 28 November 1930) is an Australian retired racing driver.

French was born in Millaa Millaa, Queensland, and his long career lasted from the 1960s to the early 1980s. He won the 1962 Australian GT Championship driving a Centaur-Waggott and in 1969 French paired with Allan Moffat to win the Sandown Three Hour race in a Ford Falcon GTHO Phase I. French was well known multi-franchise car dealer selling BMC vehicles, Alfa Romeo, Renault, Peugeot and Subaru in Brisbane. Many of the marques he sold featured prominently in his professional racing career.

Nationally however he is best remembered as Dick Johnson's co-driver to win the crash-shortened 1981 Bathurst 1000 (French was driving the #17 Ford XD Falcon when the race was stopped, but wasn't one of the cars in the accident). He regularly drove the works Ford Falcon GTHO's alongside Allan Moffat, and also drove Moffat's and Ian Geoghegan's Improved Production Ford Falcon GTHOs in the Australian Touring Car Championship rounds when Moffat and Geoghegan were driving their Mustangs.

Gallery

Career results

Complete World Touring Car Championship results
(key) (Races in bold indicate pole position) (Races in italics indicate fastest lap)

* French was listed as a driver in the #16 Ralliart Australia Starion, though he did not drive in the race.

Complete Phillip Island/Bathurst 500/1000 results

* In 1987 French was listed to drive and qualified the #16 Ralliart Starion, but never got to drive in the race

References

1930 births
Australian Touring Car Championship drivers
Bathurst 1000 winners
Living people
People from Far North Queensland
Racing drivers from Queensland
Dick Johnson Racing drivers